Homosocialization or LGBT socialization is the process by which LGBT people meet, relate and become integrated in the LGBT community, especially with people of the same sexual orientation and gender identity, helping to build their own identity as well.

Institutions

High schools 
Gay–straight alliances (GSAs) started to appear in schools the 1980s. They were a way for the youth of the community to overcome seclusion and stigma in the school environment. Currently registered under the parent network GLSEN, there are over 3,000 clubs in the United States.

The social climate of a school has a direct relationship to the health of the students, both physically and mentally. A 2003 survey of students revealed that 57% of people heard negative remarks; 69% felt unsafe; 31% had missed at least one day of school in the past month.

Universities 
Higher education organizations that house LGBT/queer people can strengthen their systems for encouraging socialization through appropriate research within the student body. Not carrying out such research damages the life of students because an institution is unable to make sure it is keeping up-to-date on relevant issues. With continued research institutes can contribute to the bettering of life and success of their LGBT students.

The last three decades have seen an increase in LGBT centers on college campuses. These centers are used to help students develop their identities on and off campus, with their intention being to promote and work towards building a more accepting and informed campus environment. The centers also frequently employ professionals who work to improve the campus life experience.

Spaces 

Spaces of homosocialization are those physical or virtual places frequented by LGBT people to meet other people of the LGBT community or to find partners, and where it is possible to express freely their sexual identity.

Before configuring places specifically for the LGBT community, the most regular practice for interaction in the gay community was sexual encounters in certain outdoor places, such as parks or public baths. Although much less frequent nowadays, cruising is still a common practice, especially among men who have sex with other men.

There are numerous businesses and associations targeting gender and sexual diversity that allow the meeting and socialization of LGBT community. In many cases, they emerge in LGBT villages, where the LGBT community is concentrated. However, many places are suffering from competition among social networks and the internet to attract LGBT people.

Digital

Social networking or/and dating or/and hookup sites 

Scruff
Tinder
Grindr
Taimi
Manhunt.net
Sniffies
Blued
Squirt.org
Her
Romeo.com
Recon
Hornet

See also 

 Cruising for sex
 Handkerchief code
 Pink capitalism
 Pinkwashing
 Queer Nation
 Stonewall Nation
 Sexuality and space
 Cass identity model
 Fassinger's model of gay and lesbian identity development

References 

LGBT culture
LGBT history
LGBT and society